The Newport Ship is a mid-fifteenth-century sailing vessel discovered by archaeologists in June 2002 in the city of Newport, South East Wales. It was found on the west bank of the River Usk, which runs through the city centre, during the building of the Riverfront Arts Centre; from which process it sustained some damage. The official name of the vessel is now the Newport Medieval Ship, to help distinguish it from other historical vessels.

Vessels of this size were considered 'great ships' by contemporary standards and were typically used for the long-distance trade between Britain, Biscay and southern Iberia.

Dendrochronology has given a likely felling date of 1449 for the majority of the timbers. These came from the Basque region of northern Spain, an area well known for its shipbuilding industry at this time. The ship is thus likely to have been built around 1449, in or close to San Sebastian. Timbers associated with later phases of repair come from Britain, as do a large number of structural pieces dating from c.1466. These timbers have been associated with the major renovation work being carried out in Newport at the time the vessel foundered.  Remnants of a cradle found beneath the ship suggested that it had been berthed for repair but then abandoned after the supports on the starboard side gave way. Many of the artefacts in the ship, such as coins, pottery and plant remains, suggest that it was trading with Portugal in the 1450s–1460s.

Although there were no initial plans to preserve the ship in its entirety, local people campaigned eagerly to ensure this, leading to the foundation of the Friends of the Newport Ship. Initial estimates suggested that preservation would cost about £3.5 million and this sum was eventually found by the Welsh Assembly Government and Newport City Council. All of the ship's timbers have subsequently been raised and transferred to a dedicated industrial unit which the local council describes as "now the biggest wood conservation centre in the UK", where preservation and research continue. Due to its size, it has not been possible to display the ship in the basement of the new arts centre, as was originally proposed.

Loss of the ship 
 
The River Usk has a large tidal range and it appears that the vessel was deballasted and carefully floated into a side channel or Pîl on a very high tide and then situated on a pre-erected cradle made of oak and elm logs. The ship appears to have been undergoing a major refit, as evidenced by the shaping and inserting of British-grown timber (dating to after 1465) into the vessel. However, before this repair work could be completed, the cradle appears to have collapsed, with the ship heeling over onto its starboard side. The subsequent incoming tides appear to have flooded the vessel with silt and water. However, efforts were made to drain, pump out and right the ship, and when these failed attention turned to salvaging the accessible timber and iron (for reuse), along with removing larger items such as anchors, guns and rigging. The salvaging of the vessel involved hacking at the upper works with axes and removing substantial amounts of the lapstrake planking, framing and internal timbers. The salvaged material would have been readily reusable in other ships or building works. During this salvage work, numerous disarticulated timbers accrued in the hold of the vessel.

Condition, dimensions and structure 
The excellent condition of the ship's timbers may possibly be due to the low oxygen level in the mud of the River Usk which has inhibited the presence of wood-boring creatures. The starboard (right) side, which collapsed onto the river mud long ago, together with the ship's frames, has been preserved to almost its full height, although some planking has been distorted by the collapse.

It had an estimated carrying capacity of 161 'tons burden'. That was a contemporary measure of ship size, based on the number of tons of wine a ship could carry. In the 1460s customs accounts of nearby Bristol, vessels of 150+ tons were typically called 'navis' (great ship) and used primarily for the long-distance voyages to southern Europe, particularly Lisbon.

The vessel was clinker built with each plank overlapping the one below, the lower plank always being on the inside of the one above. The planks of the outer hull were positioned first and, on the Newport Ship, are secured to each other with iron nails driven through the overlap from the outside and then fitted with iron rove plates. The end of each nail was then hammered flat against the rove to produce a tight seal. Gaps along the overlap were secured by caulking with tar and animal hair. Hair from horse, cow, sheep and goat has all been identified in the Newport ship. The frames (ribs) of the ship were then fitted inside the hull and secured to the planks. Each framing piece was secured to the keel (spine) of the ship by having its keel cutout placed over the keel and held by precision of fit. Nails and trenails have not been used in this ship to secure frames to keel. The keel is made of beech, but the rest of the ship is made of oak, although no reason for this has yet been suggested. One possible explanation is a simple shortage of oak compared with beech at the time of construction. Almost all woodworking on the ship has been done using axes and adzes, with saw marks found on only a few timbers.

Inside the frames are stringers: longitudinal structural components. Seven runs of stringers were found on the more-preserved starboard side. Between the stringers, the inside of the hull was lined with ceiling planksthese are thinner than the stringers and, together with the stringers, serve to stop cargo or ballast from coming into contact with the inside of the external planking of the hull. Both the stringers and ceiling planks were made of sawn oak, in contrast to the radially split hull planks and the hewn framing. The highest surviving stringer shows evidence of supporting the first deck.

Cleaning of the timbers has led to the discovery, on the planking of the outer hull, of a series of marks deliberately scribed into the timbers. These appear to be either individual shipwrights' marks or instructions for the positioning of planks or fastenings. The conservation team is hoping that a pattern will emerge as the recording process continues. During mid 2007, the cleaning of barrel-top fragments revealed merchant marks. Some of these may resemble known marks of merchants from the city of Bristol, but this is not proof that they originated there.

Dating the ship
 
Dendrochronology reveal that most of the timbers used to build the ship originate from the Basque Country of northern Spain dating from c.1449. The discovery in the spring of 2006 of a French "petit blanc" (small white) silver coin inserted into a cut out in the stempost/keel join was a major step forward. Placed, perhaps, as a token of good fortune at the start of the ship's construction, this coin was minted in Crémieu in the Dauphinois region of France between May and July 1447. Tree trunks found under the hull and forming the support for the ship when under repair, have a dendrochronology date of 1468 – 1469. This would give the ship a maximum working life span of 20 years.

There is circumstantial evidence that by 1469 the ship may have belonged to and been under repair for the Earl of Warwick. A letter of authorisation dated 22 November 1469 from Warwick to Thomas Throkmorton, his receiver of Glamorgan and Morgannwg, authorised various payments for "the making of the ship at Newport" which could be construed as repairs to the badly damaged vessel. Research has shown that Newport sometimes had some very large vessels in the fifteenth and sixteenth century, like the Newport Medieval Ship. These were used primarily to serve the long-distance trade of Bristol, which was then the second port of the realm.

Artefacts

During excavation several hundred objects were found within the ship, ranging from a stone cannonball to grape seeds and including a damaged hour glass, 13 single shoes of which one is a very expensive shoe, pieces of cork and some Portuguese coins. The seeds, cork and coins would suggest trade to and from the Iberian peninsula and the presence of Merino sheep wool in the caulking material supports this idea; but is not conclusive proof. Members of the Albaola Society  based Pasaia, near San Sebastian in the Basque region of Spain, after studying the ship's structural details believe that the ship may have been built by Basque shipwrights, either in the Basque region of Spain or south-western France. Artefacts, including Portuguese coins and ceramic shards, along with waterlogged plant remains indicate strong trading links with Portugal, with a strong possibility that the vessel was Portuguese-crewed. The ceramic shards are nearly all Iberian micaceous red-ware and likely Portuguese in origin. The ceramic assemblage is highly variable in form and also some pieces are soot stained, leading to the conclusion that this material represents crew items as opposed to cargo.

The environmental samples also contained a variety of well-preserved plant, insect and faunal remains. Food-stuffs including walnuts, almonds, hazelnuts, pomegranates, grapes, figs and olives were found, along with over a thousand fish and animal bones. Cod, hake, ling, tusk, herring, blackspot bream, conger, flatfish and Atlantic salmon are just some of the species represented in the fishbone assemblage. Shellfish recovered included oysters, whelks, mussels and cockles. Human fleas, dog fleas and numerous flies were present in the bilges of the ship, as well as some interesting beetles, including the woodboring beetle, which has never been found in the UK before. The animal bone collection primarily consisted of domesticated cattle, goats, sheep and pigs. Archaeologists also found rat bones and quantities of domestic fowl bones. In addition to salted or smoked meats and fish, it is likely that livestock was kept on board, as evidenced by certain grass and plant remains that are suited for animal food and bedding.

Project progress

The first stage of the restoration project; the cleaning and recording of the timbers, was completed in April 2008. The timbers were immersed in ordinary mains water, in a series of large shallow tanks. Small fish, including domestic goldfish and a sturgeon were successfully used to predate the various marine invertebrates that were coincidentally collected when the timbers were salvaged.

Once the cleaning had been completed the timbers were individually recorded using a FaroArm, a portable coordinate measuring machine (CMM), and RHINO software. This technology was used to produce 3-dimensional rotatable images of each artefact found in the vessel to submillimeter precision, allowing for the close study of each timber and an accurate recording of any blemishes or damage to the timbers. The Newport ship was one of the first marine archeological projects to pioneer the use of Faro equipment and RHINO software.

The next stage, the conservation of the timbers, which began later in 2008, involved immersing the timbers in polyethylene glycol (PEG) solution for an extended period. Before this began, some of the timbers required treatment with triammonium citrate to remove residual iron residues in the nail holes of the outer hull planking. This unexpected additional phase added no more than between fifteen and eighteen months to the project.

In September 2016 all of the ship's timbers completed their PEG treatment cycle and are now being freeze dried to draw out all of the residual water in preparation for the eventual reconstruction of the vessel. As of August 2019, 60% of the timbers have been freeze dried with all the timbers set to be returned by 2021.

A conference entitled "The World of the Newport Ship" was held at the University of Bristol on 17–18 July 2014, examining the vessel, her significance and her historical context. This led to the production of an edited volume based on the work of the contributors, published by the University of Wales Press.

Most current funding for the preservation of the ship comes from the Heritage Lottery Fund with smaller contributions from the National Assembly for Wales, Newport City Council and the Friends of Newport Ship.

Viewing
The Friends of Newport Ship organises regular open days when the project may be viewed in its current state of restoration along with exhibits to explain the restoration process. Visitors have the opportunity to talk to members of the ship team, and find out about the excavation and the campaign to save the ship, through tours of the facility run by the support group Friends of the Newport Ship. Generally the Ship Centre is open every Friday and Saturday between Easter and the end of October, and from on Saturdays only from spring half term until Easter and for November and early December.

Notes

References

Bibliography

External links
   
 Friends of the Newport Ship
 Newport City Council information on the ship
 Medieval ship's recovery on show — BBC, 4 June 2006
 Newport medieval ship: a decade of restoration – BBC news video, 13 April 2012
 Conference: 'The World of the Newport Ship', 17–18 July 2014
 The Newport Medieval Ship in Context: The Life and Times of a 15th Century Merchant Vessel Trading in Western Europe, a presentation by T.N. Jones & N. Nayling, 28 August 2015

Archaeology of shipwrecks
Archaeological sites in Monmouthshire
History of Newport, Wales
Culture in Newport, Wales
Ships preserved in museums
Tourist attractions in Newport, Wales
2002 archaeological discoveries
15th-century ships